Kesare  is a village in the southern state of Karnataka, India. It is located in the Mysore taluk of Mysore district.

Demographics
 India census, Kesare had a population of 5289 with 2696 males and 2593 females.

See also
 Mysore
 Districts of Karnataka
 Hale Kesare

References

External links

Villages in Mysore district
Mysore North
Suburbs of Mysore